Catherine Marie Thompson-Baker (born 16 October 1957 in Lumsden) is a former field hockey player from New Zealand, who was a member of the national team that finished sixth at the 1984 Summer Olympics in Los Angeles, California.

References

External links
 

1957 births
Living people
New Zealand female field hockey players
Olympic field hockey players of New Zealand
Field hockey players at the 1984 Summer Olympics
People from Lumsden, New Zealand
20th-century New Zealand women